Flemington is an unincorporated community in Marion County, in the U.S. state of Florida.

A post office called Flemington was established in 1847, and remained in operation until it was discontinued in 1910. The community bears the name of John Fleming.

References

Unincorporated communities in Marion County, Florida
Unincorporated communities in Florida